Oscularia is a genus of succulent flowering plants in the family Aizoaceae, native to semi-arid and rocky habitats in the Western Cape of South Africa.

It was previously included within the related genus Lampranthus, but was split off as a separate genus, due to differences in its fruit and flower.

Description

The most superficially recognisable feature of the genus is the shape of the leaves, which are grey-green and waxy. They are triangular in cross-section (3 angled) and can be sickle, club or mouth shaped. The name "Oscularia" actually means "group of tiny mouths" in Latin, and refers to the appearance of the toothed leaves in some species. The stems are often red, and the leaves can become red too during times of drought.

Abundant, almond-scented, daisy-like white or pink flowers appear throughout the summer.

Distribution
The species are restricted to the Western Cape Province, South Africa, where they occur only in winter rainfall areas. Their habitat is typically rocky areas of sandstone.

The species Oscularia deltoides is cultivated as an ornamental garden plant.

List of species
 
 Oscularia alba
 Oscularia caulescens 
 Oscularia cedarbergensis 
 Oscularia compressa 
 Oscularia comptonii 
 Oscularia copiosa
 Oscularia cremnophila 
 Oscularia deltata
 Oscularia deltoides 
 Oscularia excedens
 Oscularia falciformis 
 Oscularia guthrieae
 Oscularia lunata
 Oscularia major
 Oscularia ornata
 Oscularia paardebergensis
 Oscularia pedunculata
 Oscularia piquetbergensis
 Oscularia prasina
 Oscularia primiverna
 Oscularia steenbergensis
 Oscularia superans
 Oscularia thermarum
 Oscularia vernicolor
 Oscularia vredenburgensis

References

Aizoaceae
Aizoaceae genera